Earl Talbot is a title that has been created twice in the Peerage of Great Britain. This branch of the Talbot family descends from the Hon. Sir Gilbert Talbot (died  1518), third son of John Talbot, 2nd Earl of Shrewsbury. His great-great-great-grandson, the Right Reverend William Talbot, was Bishop of Oxford, of Salisbury and of Durham. His eldest son Charles Talbot was a prominent lawyer and politician. In 1733, he was raised to the Peerage of Great Britain as Lord Talbot, Baron of Hensol, in the County of Glamorgan, and then served as Lord High Chancellor of Great Britain from 1733 to 1737.

He was succeeded by his eldest son, the second Baron. He served as Lord Steward of the Household from 1761 to 1782. In 1761, he was created Earl Talbot and in 1780, Baron Dynevor, of Dynevor in the County of Carmarthen, in the Peerage of Great Britain. The earldom was created with normal remainder to the heirs male of his body, while the barony was created with remainder to his daughter Cecil, wife of George Rice, and her issue male.

Subsequent history
On his death in 1782, the earldom became extinct, while he was succeeded in the barony of Dynevor according to the special remainder by his daughter Cecil (see the Baron Dynevor article for later history of this branch of the family). The barony of Talbot was passed on to his nephew John, the third Baron. He was the son of the Hon. John Talbot (d. 1756), younger son of the first Baron, and his wife the Hon. Catherine Chetwynde, daughter of John Chetwynde, 2nd Viscount Chetwynde. He represented Castle Rising in the House of Commons. In 1784, the earldom was revived when he was made Viscount of Ingestre, in the County of Stafford, and Earl Talbot, of Hensol in the County of Glamorgan. Both titles were in the Peerage of Great Britain. Lord Talbot assumed by Royal licence the surname and arms of Chetwynd in 1786.

On his death, the titles passed to his son, the second Earl. He served under the Earl of Liverpool as Lord Lieutenant of Ireland from 1817 to 1821. He was succeeded by his second but eldest surviving son, the third Earl. In 1856, on the death of his distant relative Bertram Arthur Talbot, 17th Earl of Shrewsbury and 17th Earl of Waterford, he succeeded as eighteenth Earl of Shrewsbury and eighteenth Earl of Waterford. For more information on him and for further history of the peerages, see the Earl of Shrewsbury.

Several members of junior branches of the family have also gained distinction:
The Hon. John Chetwynd-Talbot, fourth son of the second Earl Talbot, was the father of:
1. John Gilbert Talbot, Member of Parliament from 1868 to 1910, who was admitted to the Privy Council in 1897 and who was the father of:
Sir George John Talbot, a Judge of the High Court of Justice, who was admitted to the Privy Council in 1937, and
Dame Meriel Lucy Talbot, a women's welfare worker, and
2. The Right Reverend Edward Stuart Talbot, Bishop of Winchester from 1911 to 1923, who was the father of
the Right Reverend Neville Stuart Talbot, Bishop of Pretoria from 1920 to 1932.
Reverend the Hon. George Gustavus Chetwynd-Talbot, fifth son of the second Earl Talbot, was the father of:
1. Gustavus Talbot, Member of Parliament for Hemel Hempstead

Barons Talbot (1733)
Charles Talbot, 1st Baron Talbot (1685–1737)
William Talbot, 2nd Baron Talbot (1710–1782) (created Earl Talbot in 1761)

Earls Talbot (first creation, 1761)
William Talbot, 1st Earl Talbot (1710–1782)

Barons Talbot (1733; reverted)
John Chetwynd-Talbot, 3rd Baron Talbot (1749–1793) (created Earl Talbot in 1784)

Earls Talbot (second creation, 1784)
John Chetwynd Chetwynd-Talbot, 1st Earl Talbot (1749–1793)
Charles Chetwynd Chetwynd-Talbot, 2nd Earl Talbot (1777–1849)
Charles Thomas Talbot, Viscount Ingestre (1802–1826)
Henry John Chetwynd-Talbot, 18th Earl of Shrewsbury, 18th Earl of Waterford and 3rd Earl Talbot (1803–1868)

See Earl of Shrewsbury for further Earls Talbot.

See also
Baron Dynevor
Viscount Chetwynd
Baron Talbot
Richard Talbot, 1st Earl of Tyrconnel
Talbot baronets

Notes

References
Kidd, Charles, Williamson, David (editors). Debrett's Peerage and Baronetage (1990 edition). New York: St Martin's Press, 1990, 

1761 establishments in Great Britain
1782 disestablishments in Great Britain
1784 establishments in Great Britain
 
Earldoms in the Peerage of Great Britain
Extinct earldoms in the Peerage of Great Britain
Earl
Noble titles created in 1784
Noble titles created in 1761